The 1893 Cork Senior Football Championship was the seventh staging of the Cork Senior Football Championship since its establishment by the Cork County Board in 1887.

On 16 July 1893, Dromtarriffe won the championship following a 0-05 to 0-03 defeat of Castlemartyr in the final at Cork Park. It remains their only championship title.

Results

Final

Statistics

Miscellaneous
 Dromtarriffe win their first title.

References

Cork Senior Football Championship